Louise of Sweden, also Louisa - Swedish also: Lovisa and Ludvika - may refer to:

Louisa Ulrika of Prussia, Queen consort of Sweden 1751
Louise of the Netherlands, Queen consort of Sweden 1859
Louise Mountbatten, Queen consort of Sweden 1950
Louise Hedwig, Princess of Sweden 1797, daughter of King Carl XIII (died in infancy)
Princess Louise Amelie of Baden, Swedish princess (claimant) 1830
Louise of Sweden, Princess of Sweden and Norway 1851, Queen (consort) of Denmark